The United States intends to build 13 small patrol vessels, based on the Damen Stan 2606 patrol vessel design, for small Caribbean nations, to be known as the Defiant class.  The US Navy, which will play an oversight role in the ship's construction, also calls the design Near Coastal Patrol Vessels. The $54 million contract was awarded to Metal Shark Boats of Louisiana.

Partner nations will include Dominican Republic, El Salvador, Honduras, Panama and Guatemala.

Like the US Coast Guard's very successful , also based on the Damen 2606 design, the Defiant-class vessels will be equipped with a stern launching ramp.

The vessels will be able to accommodate a crew of ten or more—similar to the Marine Protector class.  The vessels are powered by a pair of C32 Caterpillar  diesel engines.

Delivery

See also
  in the late 1980s Australia provided its neighbours with small patrol vessels
  Australia is replacing the patrol vessels it provided its neighbours.

References

Patrol vessels
Proposed ships